Richard Evans may refer to:

Artists 
 Richard Evans (designer) (born 1945), English creative artist for record album covers
 Richard Evans (portrait painter) (1784–1871), English portrait-painter and copyist

Entertainment 
 Dik Evans (born 1957), Irish rock guitarist
 Richard Evans (AI researcher) (born 1969), computer game developer
 Richard Evans (actor) (1935–2021), American actor
 Richard Evans (radio presenter) (born 1958), British radio presenter
 Richard Bunger Evans (born 1942), American composer
 Richard Evans (Canadian composer), Canadian television score and new age composer
 Richard Evans, a character in the 1950 film State Penitentiary
 Rich Evans III, actor and filmmaker, most notably associated with Red Letter Media

Religion 
 R. C. Evans (1861–1921), Canadian leader in the Reorganized Church of Jesus Christ of Latter Day Saints; led schism in 1918
 Richard L. Evans (1906–1971), American leader in The Church of Jesus Christ of Latter-day Saints and radio announcer

Sports 
 Dick Evans (footballer) (1874–1942), English footballer
 Dick Evans (athlete) (1915–2008), American professional basketball and football player
 Richard Evans (Australian cricketer) (1867–1939), Australian cricketer
 Richard Evans (South African cricketer) (1914–1943), South African cricketer
 Richard Evans (rugby league), rugby league footballer of the 1970s for Wales, Barrow, Swinton, and Salford
 Richard Evans (executive), American sports and entertainment executive
 Richard Evans (footballer, born 1968), Welsh former footballer
 Richard Evans (footballer, born 1983), Welsh football midfielder for Birmingham, Sheffield Wednesday and Shrewsbury
 Richie Evans (1941–1985), American racecar driver in NASCAR
 Ricky Evans (rugby union) (born 1960), Welsh rugby union international

Others 
 Richard Evans (died 1762), British Whig politician, MP for Queenborough 1729–1754
 Richard Evans (1778–1864), British colliery owner
 Richard Evans (1811–1887), son of Richard Evans (1778–1864)
 Richard Thomas Evans (1890–1946), British Liberal Party politician
 Sir Richard Evans (British diplomat) (1928–2012), British diplomat
 Richard Evans (businessman) (born 1942), English business executive, known as Dick Evans; chancellor of the University of Central Lancashire
 Richard Evans (Australian politician) (born 1953), Australian Liberal Party member, represented Cowen in the House of Representatives, 1993–1998
 Sir Richard J. Evans (born 1947), British historian and commentator
 Richard Paul Evans (born 1962), American author of books with Christian themes; best known for 1995's The Christmas Box
 Dick Evans (politician) (1922–2008), Australian politician, NSW MLC
 Evans, the defendant in the landmark Supreme Court case Romer v. Evans
 Richard Evans (lifeboatman) (1905–2001)
 Richard Evans (Maine politician), American physician and politician

See also 
 Richard Evans Schultes (1915–2001), American ethnobotanist, conservationist and author
 Ricky Evans (disambiguation)
 List of people named Evans
 Evans (surname)